Vivek Nagar or Viveka Nagar is a residential layout in Bangalore, South India. It is situated in between M G Road and Koramangala.

References

Geography of Karnataka